Frampol  is a town in Poland, in Biłgoraj County, Lublin Voivodeship. It has 1,431 inhabitants (December 2021), and lies in eastern Lesser Poland, near the Roztocze Upland. Frampol is surrounded by the Szczebrzeszyn Landscape Park and the Janów Lubelski Forest. The town is a junction of two local roads (the 74th and the 835th). The distance to Lublin is 68 kilometers.

History

The town was founded in 1717 by Count Marek Antoni Butler, with a unique, highly symmetric layout of streets in the shape of concentric rectangles around a large central square. Frampol lies in the area where once the village of Radzięcin existed. Its name, originally spelled Franopole, comes from Franciszka née Szczuka, the wife of Count Butler. In 1735, the Jewish community of Frampol already had its own cemetery, and in 1740, Józef Butler funded a wooden church, which since 1778 exists as a separate parish. In the second half of the 18th century, the town belonged to the Wisłocki family. It was an important center of artisans, mostly cloth makers, and like in other locations of eastern Poland, all houses were made of timber. Until 1795, Frampol belonged to Lublin Voivodeship, one of three regions of Lesser Poland. In 1795–1807 it was part of the Habsburg Empire, then it briefly belonged to the Duchy of Warsaw, which in 1815 was turned into Russian-controlled Congress Poland. In 1921, already in the Second Polish Republic, the population of Frampol was 2,720.

During World War II, 90% of the town's buildings were destroyed in a raid carried out by the Luftwaffe on September 13, 1939. During the German occupation, the town's significant Jewish community was murdered in the Holocaust. The town never fully recoveredits population today is less than half of what it was before the war. Frampol, or a fictionalized version thereof, is the setting of many of the best stories of Isaac Bashevis Singer, including Gimpel the Fool. Artist Irene Lieblich illustrated the Market of Frampol in Isaac Bashevis Singer's book 'A Tale of Three Wishes' from her direct memory of the marketplace of Frampol. This is the only known painting of the Frampol Marketplace as it existed before the full destruction by the German Luftwaffe.

Currently, it is one of the smallest towns in Poland. In 1869 Frampol lost its official status as a town, to recover it only in 1993.

See also

 Bombing of Frampol

References

External links
 Official town website
 Description of Frampol in the Encyclopedia of Jewish Communities in Poland
 Description of the Jewish Cemetery in Frampol

Cities and towns in Lublin Voivodeship
Biłgoraj County
Lesser Poland
Lublin Governorate
Lublin Voivodeship (1919–1939)
Populated places established in 1717
1717 establishments in the Polish–Lithuanian Commonwealth
Holocaust locations in Poland